The 2004 European Junior Swimming Championships were held from 15 to 18 July 2004 in Lisbon, Portugal.

Medal summary

Boy's events

|-
| 50 m freestyle

|-
| 100 m freestyle

|-
| 200 m freestyle
CR

|-
| 400 m freestyle

|-
| 1500 m freestyle

|-
| 50 m backstroke

|-
| 100 m backstroke

|-
| 200 m backstroke

|-
| 50 m breaststroke

|-
| 100 m breaststroke

|-
| 200 m breaststroke

|-
| 50 m butterfly

|-
| 100 m butterfly

|-
| 200 m butterfly

|-
| 200 m individual medley

|-
| 400 m individual medley

|-
|  freestyle relay

|-
|  freestyle relay

|-
|  medley relay

 

|}

Girl's events

|-
| 50 m freestyle

|-
| 100 m freestyle

|-
| 200 m freestyle
CR

|-
| 400 m freestyle

|-
| 800 m freestyle

|-
| 50 m backstroke

|-
| 100 m backstroke

|-
| 200 m backstroke

|-
| 50 m breaststroke

|-
| 100 m breaststroke

|-
| 200 m breaststroke

|-
| 50 m butterfly

|-
| 100 m butterfly

|-
| 200 m butterfly
CR

|-
| 200 m individual medley

|-
| 400 m individual medley

|-
|  freestyle relay

|-
|  freestyle relay

|-
|  medley relay

|}

2004 in swimming
2004 in Portuguese sport
European Junior Swimming Championships
Sports competitions in Lisbon
International aquatics competitions hosted by Portugal
Swimming competitions in Portugal
July 2004 sports events in Europe
2000s in Lisbon
Swimming